Mougna is a village and seat of the rural commune of Néma-Badenyakafo in the Cercle of Djenné in the Mopti Region of southern-central Mali.

External links
.

Populated places in Mopti Region